Ursenbach may also refer to:

 Ursenbach is a municipality in Switzerland in the Oberaargau administrative district.
 Maureen Ursenbach Beecher (born 1935), English professor